Siegfried Hold (1931 – 2003) was a German cinematographer. During the 1960s he shot a number of European western and adventure films, often co-productions between West Germany and other nations. He was the brother of the actress Marianne Hold. They were born in East Prussia, but towards the end of the Second World War they fled from the advancing Soviet forces and settled in Innsbruck.

Selected filmography
 The Stolen Trousers (1956)
 Robert and Bertram (1961)
 The Happy Years of the Thorwalds (1962)
 Wild Water (1962)
 Café Oriental (1962)
The Curse of the Yellow Snake (1963)
 Old Shatterhand (1964)
 Freddy in the Wild West (1964)
 The Monster of London City (1964)
 Legacy of the Incas (1965)
 Call of the Forest (1965)
 The Treasure of the Aztecs (1965)
 The Pyramid of the Sun God (1965)
 Killer's Carnival (1966)
 The Sweet Sins of Sexy Susan (1967)
 Spy Today, Die Tomorrow (1967)
 Target for Killing (1969)
 The Countess Died of Laughter (1973)

References

Bibliography
 Bergfelder, Tim. International Adventures: German Popular Cinema and European Co-Productions in the 1960s. Berghahn Books, 2005.

External links

1931 births
2003 deaths
German cinematographers
People from Pisz
Film people from Innsbruck